is a railway station of the Chūō Main Line, East Japan Railway Company (JR East) in Sakaori 1-chōme, in the city of Kōfu, Yamanashi Prefecture, Japan.

Lines
Sakaori Station is served by the Chūō Main Line, and is 131.2 kilometers from the terminus of the line at Tokyo Station.

Station layout
The station consists of one ground level  side platform and a one island platform serving three tracks, connected by an underground passage. The station is staffed.

Platforms

History 
Sakaori Station was opened on February 11, 1926 as a station on the Japanese Government Railways (JGR) Chūō Main Line. The JGR became the JNR (Japanese National Railways) after the end of World War II. Scheduled freight services were discontinued from November 1986.  With the dissolution and privatization of the JNR on April 1, 1987, the station came under the control of the East Japan Railway Company. Automated turnstiles using the Suica IC Card system came into operation from October 16, 2004. The current station building was completed in February 2006.

Passenger statistics
In fiscal 2017, the station was used by an average of 2,203 passengers daily (boarding passengers only).

Surrounding area
 Furouen - Garden Park of Eternal Life
 iCLA (International College of Liberal Arts)
 Kofu Higashi High School
 Yamanashi Eiwa College
 Yamanashi Gakuin University
 Yamanashi Gakuin Junior College
 Yamanashi Gakuin High School
 Kai Zenkoji Temple

See also
 List of railway stations in Japan

References

 Miyoshi Kozo. Chuo-sen Machi to eki Hyaku-niju nen. JT Publishing (2009)

External links

JR East Sakaori Station

Railway stations in Yamanashi Prefecture
Railway stations in Japan opened in 1926
Chūō Main Line
Stations of East Japan Railway Company
Kōfu, Yamanashi